Sankat Mochan Hanuman was an Indian television mythological series based on the legends of Hanumaan, Ram, Sita and Lakshman. It released on 10 March 2012 and ran until 10 November, 2013 in DD National.

The show originally aired in Hindi and is  after being dubbed in Marathi, Tamil, Telgu, Malayalam, Kannada, Maithili.

Cast

Main
Chandan Madan as Lord Rama
Samiksha Bhatt as Devotee Sita
Kunal Singh Rajpoot as Lakshmana

Recurring
Heta Shah as Anjani (Hanuman's Mother) 
Raj Premi as Ravan (King of Lanka)
Amit Pachori as Indrajit (Meghnad) (Son of Ravan and Prince of Lanka)
Bhupinder Bhoopi as Kumbhakarna (Ravan's younger brother and Vibhishana's elder brother)
Ram Awana as Vibhishana (Ravan's younger brother)
Sonia Singh Rajput as Surpankha
Amit Singh as Ravan's Mantri
Ravish Rathi as Pawan Dev
 Yukti Kapoor as Sulochana

Reception
The show had the highest TRP on the channel.

References

External links
Sankat Mochan Hanuman on IMDb
Sankat Mochan Hanuman all episodes on YouTube

Indian drama television series
Indian television soap operas
2012 Indian television series debuts
Indian television series about Hindu deities
Hinduism in popular culture